Jackie Fayter-Hough (born 10 June 1951) is a British former professional tennis player.

Biography
Born in Devon, Fayter played on the international circuit during the 1970s and appeared in the main draw of all four Grand Slam tournaments. She made the third round of the 1974 Australian Open and 1976 US Open. Her title wins include the Scandinavian Indoor Championships in 1977.

Since 1980, she has been known as Jackie Fayter-Hough through marriage.

References

External links
 
 

1951 births
Living people
British female tennis players
English female tennis players
Tennis people from Devon
Sportspeople from Exeter
20th-century British women